Swart gevaar (Afrikaans for "black danger") was a term used during apartheid in South Africa to refer to the perceived security threat of the majority black African population to the white South African government. It was used by the Herenigde Nasionale Party in the 1948 general election to promote the Sauer Commission's recommendation of apartheid.

See also

 Rooi gevaar ("red threat")
 Red Scare
 Yellow Peril

References

History of South Africa
Apartheid in propaganda
Afrikaans words and phrases
Scares
Political terminology in South Africa
Apartheid in South Africa